West Sutton railway station is in the London Borough of Sutton in South London, England. The station is served by Thameslink trains on the Sutton Loop Line. It is in Travelcard Zone 5. It is close to Gander Green Lane, the home ground of Sutton United.

History
Parliamentary approval for a line from Wimbledon to Sutton had been obtained by the Wimbledon and Sutton Railway (W&SR) in 1910 but work had been delayed by World War I. From the W&SR's inception, the District Railway (DR) was a shareholder of the company and had rights to run trains over the line when built. In the 1920s, the Underground Electric Railways Company of London (UERL, precursor of London Underground) planned, through its ownership of the DR, to use part of the route for an extension of the City and South London Railway (C&SLR, now the Northern line) to Sutton. The SR objected and an agreement was reached that enabled the C&SLR to extend as far as Morden in exchange for the UERL giving up its rights over the W&SR route. The SR subsequently built the line, one of the last to be built in the London area. West Sutton station replaced the UERL's planned Cheam station on Cheam Road to the south. The station opened on 5 January 1930 when full services on the line were extended from South Merton.

Services
All services at West Sutton are operated by Thameslink using  EMUs.

The typical off-peak service in trains per hour is:
 2 tph to 
 2 tph to 

Connections
London Buses route 413 serve the station.

References

External links

Railway stations in the London Borough of Sutton
Former Southern Railway (UK) stations
Railway stations in Great Britain opened in 1930
Railway stations served by Govia Thameslink Railway
Sutton, London